Russell Scott Swan (born March 30, 1963) is a former American football linebacker in the National Football League for the Dallas Cowboys. He played college football at the University of Virginia.

Early years
Swan attended Yorktown High School, where he was a starter at linebacker. He accepted a football scholarship from the University of Virginia, where he was a four-year starter at linebacker. As a senior, he led the team with 125 tackles (third in school history), collecting 58 solo tackles and 67 assisted tackles. 

He finished his career as the school's second All-time leading tackler (373), after making 181 solo tackles and 192 assisted tackles.

Professional career
Swan was signed as an undrafted free agent by the Dallas Cowboys after the 1986 NFL Draft. He was waived on August 26.

In 1987, he was signed as a free agent. He was released on September 1. After the NFLPA strike was declared on the third week of the season, those contests were canceled (reducing the 16 game season to 15) and the NFL decided that the games would be played with replacement players. He was re-signed to be a part of the Dallas replacement team that was given the mock name "Rhinestone Cowboys" by the media. He started 3 games at middle linebacker. On October 27, he was placed on the injured reserve list.

References

1963 births
Living people
People from Fairview Park, Ohio
Players of American football from Ohio
Sportspeople from Cuyahoga County, Ohio
American football linebackers
Virginia Cavaliers football players
Dallas Cowboys players
National Football League replacement players